The National League speedway 2018 was the 2018 season of the third tier/division of British speedway.

Eastbourne Eagles won the playoffs and were declared champions. They completed the double by winning the Knockout Cup.

Results

Fixtures

Teams face each other two times: once home and once away.

The following National League matches were not staged during the 2018 league season
Buxton Hitmen Vs Coventry Bees
Eastbourne Eagles Vs Mildenhall Fen Tigers

Table

Final National League Table Up To And Including Sunday 28 October

Coventry Bees were in fourth place and higher in the league table then Birmingham Brummies at the cut-off date to decide the National League play-off places.

Play-Offs

Home team scores are in bold
Overall aggregate scores are in red

Semi-finals

Grand Final

National League Knockout Cup
The 2018 National League Knockout Cup was the 21st edition of the Knockout Cup for tier three teams.

Home team scores are in bold
Overall aggregate scores are in red

First round

Quarter-finals

Semi-finals

Grand Final

National Trophy

Northern Section

Fixtures

Teams face each other two times: once home and once away.

Table

National Trophy Northern Section Table Up to And Including Wednesday 1 August

Southern Section

Fixtures

Teams face each other two times: once home and once away.

Table

Final National Trophy Southern Section Table

Grand Final

Final leading averages

Teams and final averages

Belle Vue Colts
 
 8.84
 8.59
 8.34
 7.52
 5.71
 3.92
 2.78

Birmingham Brummies

 10.54
 10.38
 9.10
 8.86
 5.33
 4.68
 3.36
 2.22
 2.00
 1.80

Buxton Hitmen

 8.44
 7.33
 7.18
 6.18
 3.27
 2.65
 2.30

Coventry Bees

 10.18
 8.21
 7.61
 7.42
 6.82
 5.73
 3.92

Cradley Heathens

The Cradley  team only took part in the National Trophy competition

Eastbourne Eagles

 9.58
 9.16
 8.70
 8.25
 6.80
 6.45
 6.11
 5.44

Isle of Wight Warriors

 9.51
 9.47
 7.37
 6.62
 5.35
 4.15
 3.35
 2.50

Kent Kings

 10.10
 8.55
 8.32
 8.17
 7.50
 5.94
 5.64
 3.20
 1.14

Mildenhall Fen Tigers

 9.59
 9.37
 9.25
 8.56
 8.21
 8.17
 5.86
 5.53

Plymouth Devils

 10.00
 9.38
 8.42
 6.75
 7.31
 6.21
 2.44
 3.67

Stoke Potters

 8.72
 8.00
 6.56
 6.49
 4.83
 4.36
 3.38
 3.00
 1.43

Development Leagues

Midland Development League

Northern Junior League

Southern Development League

See also
List of United Kingdom speedway league champions

References

National League
Speedway National League
Speedway National League